Nathaniel Bond KS (14 June 163431 August 1707), of Creech Grange in the Isle of Purbeck, Dorset, was an English lawyer and Member of Parliament.

 
Bond was the fourth son of Denis Bond, a prominent politician during the Interregnum, succeeding to the family estates at Lutton after all his elder brothers died without male heirs, and also in 1686 buying the neighbouring estate of Grange which subsequently became the family seat.

He was educated at Oxford University, awarded a fellowship at All Souls College, matriculated from Wadham College in 1650, graduating B.C.L. in 1654, and incorporated LL.B. at Cambridge University in 1659. He proceeded to the Inner Temple, where he was called to the bar in 1661. Making his career in the law, he was a barrister and King's Serjeant. He entered Parliament in 1679 as member for Corfe Castle, and subsequently also represented Dorchester in 1681.

On 21 December 1667 he married Elizabeth Churchill (b. 1648/9 d. 1674). His second marriage, on 3 August 1675, was to Mary Browne (d. 1728), widow of Thomas Browne of Frampton and daughter of Lewis Williams of Shitterton, and they had two sons:
 Denis Bond of Creech Grange (1676–1747), MP for Dorchester, Corfe Castle and Poole, his heir
 John Bond of Tyneham (1678–1744), MP for Corfe Castle

He bought Creech Grange near Wareham in 1691.

References

 
 "Bond of Grange" in Burke’s Landed Gentry (4th edition, London: Harrison, Pall Mall, 1862–3)

1634 births
1707 deaths
Members of the Parliament of England for Dorchester
Alumni of Wadham College, Oxford
Fellows of All Souls College, Oxford
Alumni of the University of Cambridge
English lawyers
17th-century English lawyers
English MPs 1680–1681
English MPs 1681
English MPs 1695–1698
Serjeants-at-law (England)